Pikeville, Alabama, may refer to one of the two following places in the U.S. state of Alabama:
Pikeville, Jackson County, Alabama
Pikeville, Marion County, Alabama